This is a list of mayors of Spokane, Washington, a city in the northwestern United States.

References

Spokane, Washington (USA)